Assembla is a web-based version control and source code management software as a service provider for enterprises. It was founded in 2005 and acquired by San Antonio Venture Equity firm Scaleworks in 2016. It offers Git, Perforce Helix Core and Apache Subversion repository management, integrations with other enterprise software such as Trello, Slack and JIRA as well as the Cornerstone Subversion client for macOS. Assembla also offers integrations with customers' managed private clouds.

History
The company was officially formed in 2005, and was headed by Andy Singleton, creator of PowerSteering Software.

Initially, Assembla offered free on-demand tools such as Trac and Subversion hosting. Assembla began charging for some of its products in October 2008.

In 2012, Assembla partnered with Perforce Software to offer on-demand versions of Perforce’s Software Version Management tool, Helix Core, that is integrated with team tools from Assembla for an extra fee.

In 2013, Assembla released a set of tools related to Agile development and Continuous Delivery processes called "Renzoku." These are now included as part of the core offering for the team and enterprise plans.

In May 2016, Assembla was purchased by Venture Equity provider Scaleworks. The company is currently based in San Antonio, Texas.

On Jan 18th 2018, Assembla acquired Cornerstone, a Subversion client for macOS.

Products
Assembla is a source code management tool specializing in providing cloud-based version control services for code projects and agile software development. They offer an additional project management tool for those using their cloud repositories.

Assembla hosts more than 100,000 client projects. Their customer base includes game development firms, consultants, outsourcers, and digital agencies. Assembla offers Apache Subversion, Git, and Perforce code repositories. Additionally, Assembla integrates with tools such as Slack, GitHub, and JIRA.

Pricing
Currently, Assembla offers 3 pricing levels: "Starter," "Team," and "Perforce Cloud." Assembla previously offered a free tier between 2003 and 2008, and again between 2010 and 2014. Currently, a free 14-day trial is offered on all plans.

See also 

 Comparison of free software hosting facilities
 Comparison of issue-tracking systems
 Comparison of subversion clients
 SourceForge
 Google Code
 CodePlex

References

External links
 

Open-source software hosting facilities

ko:바운티소스